Bouix is a French surname. Notable people with the surname include: 

 Évelyne Bouix (born 1953), French actress
 Marie Dominique Bouix (1808–1870), French Jesuit canon lawyer

French-language surnames